Jayme de Almeida Filho (born 17 March 1953) is a Brazilian professional football coach and former player. A retired centre-back, as a player he spent almost his entire club career with Flamengo.

Playing career
Jayme de Almeida was born in Rio de Janeiro, son of Flamengo ex-player and coach Jaime de Almeida. He played as a defender at Flamengo, his father's former club, between 1973 and 1977, in 198 games, scoring three goals during that time. He then joined São Paulo, where he played 55 matches between 1977 and 1980, the team winning the Campeonato Paulista in 1980. In 1980, he had a stint at Sport, arriving during the Campeonato Pernambucano, which they won that year. He later played for Guarani. He served in the Brazil national football team in 1976.

Post-playing career
He debuted as a coach for Desportiva Ferroviaria in 1992; that year they won the Championship Capixaba. He was head coach for Iraty in 2009.

He assumed the post of technical assistant at Vanderlei Luxemburgo in October 2010. and with the fall of the then coach, commanded interim time in games of has assumed interim time in games of Taça Guanabara that year.

With the unexpected exit Mano Menezes upturn command, again as interim and months after being hired. where in that year was Copa do Brasil.

Honours

Player
 Flamengo
 Campeonato Carioca: 1974

 São Paulo
 Campeonato Paulista: 1980

Coach
 Desportiva Ferroviária
  Campeonato Capixaba: 1992

 CFZ
 Campeonato Carioca Série C: 1997

 Flamengo

 Copa do Brasil: 2013
 Campeonato Carioca: 2014

References

External links
Ogol coach profile 
Soccerway profile

1957 births
Living people
Footballers from Rio de Janeiro (city)
Brazilian footballers
Brazilian football managers
Campeonato Brasileiro Série A players
Campeonato Brasileiro Série A managers
CR Flamengo footballers
São Paulo FC players
Guarani FC players
Brazil international footballers
Desportiva Ferroviária managers
Iraty Sport Club managers
CR Flamengo managers
Association football defenders